Monte Creek Provincial Park is a provincial park in British Columbia, Canada, located in the locality of Monte Creek, British Columbia. Created in 1996, it is only 3 hectares in size, and protects a forested riparian area and also quiggly hole ("kekuli") sites of the Shuswap people, which have been formally studied as an archaeological site. The location was also part of the route of the Hudson's Bay Brigade Trail to the Cariboo via Kamloops from what is now the United States, as was Monte Lake in the upper basin of the eponymous creek.

References

Provincial parks of British Columbia
Thompson Country
1996 establishments in British Columbia
Protected areas established in 1996